The Unknown Wife is a 1921 American silent drama film directed by William Worthington and starring Edith Roberts, Spottiswoode Aitken and Casson Ferguson. It is also known by the alternative title of Three at the Table.

Cast
 Edith Roberts as 	Helen Wilburton
 Spottiswoode Aitken as Henry Wilburton
 Casson Ferguson as 	Donald Grant
 Joe Quinn as 'Lefty' Mayes
 Joe Neary as 'Slim' Curry
 Augustus Phillips as John Mayberry
 Bertram Frank as Thomas Gregory
 Mathilde Brundage as Mrs. Stanwood Kent
 Jessie Pratt as Mrs. Dalton
 Edith Stayart as Doris Dalton
 Hal Wilson as 	Brooks

References

Bibliography
 Connelly, Robert B. The Silents: Silent Feature Films, 1910-36, Volume 40, Issue 2. December Press, 1998.
 Munden, Kenneth White. The American Film Institute Catalog of Motion Pictures Produced in the United States, Part 1. University of California Press, 1997.

External links
 

1921 films
1921 drama films
1920s English-language films
American silent feature films
Silent American drama films
Films directed by William Worthington
American black-and-white films
Universal Pictures films
1920s American films